Lehara is also known as Nehara (Nehara East, Nehara West). Lehara is a village in the Manigachhi block of Darbhanga district in the state of Bihar, India.

Schools and Colleges
There is three Middle School, one primary school, two High School and one College.

See also 
List of villages in Darbhanga district

References 

Villages in Darbhanga district
Darbhanga district